Cell breathing may refer to:

 Cellular respiration, metabolic reactions and processes that take place in the cells of organisms
 Cell breathing (telephony), radio interference from other mobile transmitters in the same cell